Turriff Academy is a  non denominational comprehensive co-educational secondary school located in Turriff, Aberdeenshire, Scotland. It serves a large catchment area lying between Inverurie in the south, Huntly to the west, Banff to the north and Fraserburgh and Ellon to the northeast or south-east.

Colin Clark, former MP for Gordon, is an ex pupil of the school.

References

External links
 Turriff Academy Web site

Secondary schools in Aberdeenshire
Turriff